NGC 625 is a dwarf barred spiral galaxy about 12.7 Mly away in the constellation Phoenix.  NGC 625 is a member of the Sculptor Group.

References

External links
 
 

NGC 0625
NGC 0625
NGC 0625
NGC 0625
0625
05896